Olšovany is a village and municipality in Košice-okolie District in the Kosice Region of eastern Slovakia.

History
In historical records the village was first mentioned in 1272.

Geography
The village lies at an altitude of 245 metres and covers an area of 9.974 km².
It has a population of about 545 people.

Ethnicity
The population is almost entirely Slovak in ethnicity.

Culture
The village has a public library and a number of stores including food facilities.

External links

Villages and municipalities in Košice-okolie District